George Henry Lane-Fox Pitt-Rivers (22 May 1890 – 17 June 1966) was a British anthropologist and eugenicist who was one of the wealthiest men in England in the interwar period. He embraced anti-Bolshevism and anti-Semitism and became a supporter of Oswald Mosley, which led to him being interned by the British government for two years during the Second World War.

Life
Pitt-Rivers was born in London, his birth registered under the surname Fox in Chesterfield. He was a son of Alexander Edward Lane Fox-Pitt-Rivers (2 November 1855 – 19 August 1927) and his wife Alice Ruth Hermione, daughter of Lord Henry Thynne. His father was the eldest son of Augustus Pitt Rivers, ethnologist and anthropologist and founder of the Pitt Rivers Museum, upon whose death in 1900 Alexander inherited the Pitt-Rivers estate. After Alexander died in 1927, the estate was inherited by George and it was so large that "it was said, albeit with exaggeration, that he could ride from coast to coast without leaving his own land".

He was a Captain in the 5th Dragoon Guards and took part in World War I. He was wounded in the First Battle of Ypres and subsequently sent to England for surgery and recuperation. After the war he published a book The World Significance of the Russian Revolution, the first of his anti-Bolshevik and anti-Semitic public activities. During 1922–25, Pitt-Rivers held the position of Principal Secretary and Aide-de-Camp to his father-in-law Lord Forster, the Governor-General of Australia. His experience with the Maori led to his lasting interest in anthropology, which he studied at Oxford under Bronisław Malinowski.

In 1927 he attended the World Population Conference and published a book Clash of Cultures and the Contact of Races. Two years later, Pitt-Rivers was elected a fellow of the Royal Anthropological Institute; he also represented the Eugenics Society at the International Federation of Eugenics Organizations. From 1931 to 1937, Pitt-Rivers held the positions of the Secretary General and Treasurer of the International Union for the Scientific Investigation of Population Problems, where he came into contact with German eugenicists Eugen Fischer and his assistant Lothar Loeffler. During this time, he also became increasingly embroiled in politics, praising the ideas of Benito Mussolini and Adolf Hitler.

Pitt-Rivers was held in Brixton Prison and Ascot internment centre (1940–1942) during the Second World War as a Mosleyite Nazi sympathiser under the Defence Regulation 18B.

George Pitt-Rivers died in 1966.

Personal life
George Henry Lane-Fox Pitt-Rivers was twice married; firstly to the Hon. Rachel Forster (daughter of the 1st Baron Forster) on 22 December 1915; the marriage was dissolved in 1930. They had two sons:
 Michael Pitt-Rivers (1917–1999), a West Country landowner who gained national notoriety in the 1950s when he was put on trial charged with sodomy.
 Julian Pitt-Rivers (1919–2001), a social anthropologist, ethnographer, and university professor.

Pitt-Rivers married, secondly, on 14 October 1931, Rosalind Venetia Henley (1907–1990), a biochemist, whose parents were Brigadier-General the Hon. Anthony Morton Henley (1873–1925), a younger son of the 3rd Baron Henley, and  Sylvia Laura Stanley, daughter of the 4th Baron Stanley of Alderley. Their marriage was dissolved in 1937, and they had one child together:
 (George) Anthony (b. 1932); who married, in 1964, Valerie Scott, who was Lord Lieutenant of Dorset between 2006 and 2014.

After the Second World War, Pitt-Rivers met Stella Lonsdale, who had been incarcerated in Paris by the Germans, suspected of being a British spy; when she eventually managed to make her way to England, she was imprisoned under suspicion of being a German spy. She became the mistress of Pitt-Rivers and took his surname, although they never married.
Stella inherited substantial property from Pitt-Rivers when he died in 1966. In his will, he left instructions that any properties to be sold must be offered individually, rather than as an estate, in order that tenants might buy the properties they leased from the Pitt-Rivers Estate. Much of the village of Okeford Fitzpaine was thus sold to former tenants. Stella also sold a large proportion of the artefacts held in the Pitt-Rivers Museum at Farnham, Dorset, which she had also inherited from Pitt-Rivers. The Pitt Rivers Museum in Oxford has been trying ever since to recover those items, which were uncatalogued.

References

Literature

External links
 
The Papers of George Henry Lane-Fox Pitt-Rivers held at Churchill Archives Centre

1890 births
1966 deaths
English anthropologists
British eugenicists
People detained under Defence Regulation 18B